The CFR-600 is a sodium-cooled pool-type fast-neutron nuclear reactor under construction in Xiapu County, Fujian province, China, on Changbiao Island.
It is a generation IV demonstration project by the China National Nuclear Corporation (CNNC).
The project is also known as Xiapu fast reactor pilot project.
Construction of the reactor started in late 2017. These reactors are expected to be connected to the grid in 2023 and 2025.
The reactor will have an output of 1500 MWth thermal power and 600 MW electric power. The fuel will be supplied by TVEL, subsidiary of Rosatom, according to the agreement signed in 2019.

The CFR-600 is part of the Chinese plan to reach a closed nuclear fuel cycle.
Fast neutron reactors are considered the main technology in the future for nuclear power in China.

A larger commercial-scale reactor, the CFR-1000, is also planned.

On the same site, the building of a second 600 MW fast reactor CFR-600 was started in December 2020 and four 1000 MW CAP1000 are proposed.

There are concerns from the West that these breeder reactors will be used to produce weapon grade plutonium for nuclear weapon manufacturing purposes.

Reactors

Controversy

AlJazeera reported in 2021 that the reactors are controversial because they will produce weapons-grade plutonium, so likely have a dual military and civilian use, and China has stopped annual voluntary declarations to the International Atomic Energy Agency [IAEA] on its stocks of plutonium.

See also
 Nuclear power in China
 China Experimental Fast Reactor (CEFR)
 BN-600 reactor
 BN-1200 reactor
 Integral fast reactor
 List of nuclear reactors#China

References

nuclear power stations in China
Fast-neutron reactors